The Ardito class of destroyers consisted of two ships— and —that were built for the Italian  (Royal Navy) in the 1910s.

Design
They had a crew of 4 officers and 65 enlisted men. The ships were powered by two Parsons steam turbines, with steam provided by four Thornycroft water-tube boilers.

The ships carried an armament that consisted of a single  gun and four  guns, along with two  torpedo tubes. The 102 mm gun was placed on the forecastle and the two of the 76 mm guns were mounted abreast the funnels, with the remaining pair at the stern. The torpedo tubes were in single mounts, both on the centerline.

Ships

Service history
Ardito was struck from the naval register on 2 October 1931 and discarded, while Ardente remained in the navy's inventory until 11 March 1937, when she too was struck and broken up.

Notes

References
 

Ardito-class destroyers